Montecchio is a village in Tuscany, central Italy,  administratively a frazione of the comune of Peccioli, province of Pisa. At the time of the 2001 census its population was 158.

References 

Frazioni of the Province of Pisa